Garofalo may refer to:

People

 Deceased Italians:
 Il Garofalo (1481–1559), Italian painter
 Raffaele Garofalo (1851–1934), Italian jurist and criminologist
 Carlo Giorgio Garofalo (1886–1962), Italian composer and organist
 Living people:
Americans:
 Ray Garofalo (b. ca. 1958), Louisiana businessman and politician
 Janeane Garofalo (born 1964),  actress and activist
 Pat Garofalo (born 1971), Minnesota state-level politician
 Agostino Garofalo (born 1984), Italian footballer

Other
 a whirlpool off the coast of Italy
 Garofalo, an album by classical composer Joel Spiegelman

Italian-language surnames